No. 25 Squadron of the Royal New Zealand Air Force was formed at Seagrove, Auckland in July 1943 with Douglas SBD Dauntless dive bombers and served in the Southern Pacific based at the Piva Airstrip on Bougainville, flying missions against Japanese forces on Bougainville and at Rabaul. It was disbanded in May 1944 and reformed as a fighter/ground attack squadron flying F4U Corsairs. It served in Santo, Guadalcanal, Los Negros and Emirau, before returning to New Zealand and being disbanded in September 1945. A SBD-4 Dauntless operated by 25 Squadron was for a time preserved in the Royal New Zealand Air Force Museum at Wigram, displayed in the condition which it was recovered after being lost with its crew while on a training mission at Espiritu Santo. One of the SBD-5 aircraft operated by 25 Squadron has been restored to flying condition in America for the "Planes of Fame" museum, in the colour scheme of an American aircraft.

Formation
25 Squadron was formed at Seagrove, near Auckland, on 31 July 1943 with twelve crews and a maintenance unit. This was later increased to eighteen crews. The commanding officer was Squadron Leader Theodore Jasper Maclean de Lange (born Simla 16 June 1914, died Rotorua 4 July 2005), a burly and moustachioed figure who later became the Air Member for Personnel. He became a CBE in 1965 and retired in February 1966. Other members of the squadron were mostly from the army co-operation and anti-aircraft units, with an average age of 23 years, although at least one pilot (Leslie McLellan-Symonds b. 1911) was older than de Lange.

The initial supply of aircraft was nine SBD-3 aircraft from MAG-14. These machines were reputed to be veterans of the earlier Pacific battles and were in poor condition.

For the next few months the crews trained while the maintenance personnel struggled to keep the aircraft flying, requesting and receiving several more SBD-3 (and later SBD-4) machines from the Americans to maintain operational numbers. The aeroplanes were operated in their original USMC markings with squadron numbers painted on, until being "brought on charge" in November 1943. On completion of initial training, the squadron celebrated by flying eighteen aeroplanes over Auckland just before luncheon on 6 January 1944, to the great interest of the civilian population.

Espiritu Santo

On 30 January 1944 squadron personnel were flown by Lodestar and C-47 aircraft of 40 Squadron to Espiritu Santo for further training with American units. A further supply of eighteen SBD-4 aircraft were awaiting them, but these were almost as decrepit as the machines they had left behind in New Zealand. Nevertheless, the squadron was able to complete training in gunnery, dive-bombing and formation flying. It was during this training period that NZ5037 went missing with both crew members while on a practice Beam Approach. Despite extensive searches no trace of the 'plane or its crew was found. NZ5037 remained lost in the jungle until 1987 when it was located and returned to New Zealand by 3 Squadron.

The squadron received eighteen new SBD-5 aircraft in February 1944. The intention was to deploy the squadron immediately at Piva Airfield on the island of Bougainville, but due to the tenuous state of the Allied beachhead on the island, deployment was delayed until the risk of shelling on the Piva Airfield had reduced.

Bougainville
25 Squadron flew in its SBD-5s to Guadalcanal on 22 March, escorted by four Venturas and one C-47 from 40 Squadron. A Catalina from 6 Squadron stood by at Halavo Seaplane Base in the Florida Islands as a safety aircraft. At Guadalcanal NZ5055, piloted by F/O Bruce Graham, swerved on landing at Henderson Field and collided with an oil-drum, the plane was written off. From Henderson Field the squadron flew to Piva Airfield on 23 January. While in transit, the gunner in NZ5063 inadvertently fired his stowed machine-guns and caused considerable damage to the fuselage. The guns were not supposed to be able to be fired while pointed at any part of the aircraft. Upon landing at Piva, the New Zealanders found themselves on a narrow beachhead, with Japanese forces shelling and attacking the perimeter.

The first mission flown from Piva was an artillery-spotting exercise undertaken by MacLean de Lange and his gunner at 06:15 on 24 March. Over the course of the day, the squadron flew three more sorties against the Japanese. So close were the enemy, that during one of these raids, ground crew on the airstrip were able to watch the pilots drop their bombs.

Tour summary
25 Squadron flew missions from Piva for approximately eight weeks. During this time they flew almost daily missions against Japanese forces on Bougainville and New Britain. Many of the missions were against airfields near the Japanese stronghold of Rabaul.  

In addition, dozens of artillery pieces were destroyed and considerable damage caused to airfields and other military property.

NZ5055 crashed and was written off at Henderson Field on Guadalcanal on 22 March. NZ5054 and NZ5059 crashed and burned on landing at Piva on 2 April after a strike when their "hung-up" bombs jolted loose and exploded. NZ5058 was written off due to damage received over Rabaul on 17 April.

Crew losses

NZ211
Stalled while low flying near Waiuku, New Zealand on 13 September 1943 and crashed and burned with the loss of PLTOFF William McJannet and SGT Douglas Cairns.

NZ5037
NZ5037 with its crew of FGOFF Alexander Moore and FSGT John Munro went missing on 11 February at Espiritu Santo on a radio range familiarisation flight. The aircraft went missing in the cloud covered hills around the area and despite extensive searches the wreckage was not found until 1987.

"176"
On 4 April a flight of three SBDs flying to Piva from Henderson Field became lost and one aircraft, a replacement coded "176" piloted by FGOFF Leslie McLellan-Symonds separated from the flight and disappeared. Radio transmissions received later that evening suggested that he was planning to ditch near the Tanga Islands. It has never been established how or where his flight ended, although the most likely scenario is that he ditched or bailed out near the Tanga Islands. McLellan-Symonds was later captured and shot in the left thigh by the Japanese and transported to Rabaul, where he was interned at Tunnel Hill Road. McLellan-Symonds' last days were described by one of his fellow prisoners, Jose Holguin, in his testimonial written in 1948, reproduced in part below.

"A prisoner of war known to me only as Simmons arrived at Tunnel Hill Prisoner of War Camp in April 1944. He was suffering from a leg wound on his left thigh. I and other prisoners of war provided Simmons with first aid treatment by tearing our shirts into bandages. However, because of the lack of medical attention shown Simmons by the camp authorities, who did nothing to improve his condition, he became delirious and did not know his whereabouts or condition. This was after our removal from the Tunnel Hill prisoner of war camp cave on or about 15 March 1944, to a prison shack which we occupied after our removal from and near to the Tunnel Hill prisoner of war camp cave. Simmons would crawl towards the locked door and say, "Hurry, we will be late, the car is waiting and everything is all set". We would carry him back to his spot on the floor whenever he would escape our attention. After repeated requests were made by myself and the other prisoners of war, Chief Medical Orderly Oyamada came to the prison shack and after looking at Simmons, said that Simmons needed a blood transfusion and an operation to remove a bullet which was embedded in his thigh, but that it would be impossible to give such aid to Simmons without orders from Doctor Fusitita or Colonel Kikuchi. Simmons died on 28 May 1944 and to the best of my knowledge, the cause of his death was attributed to a lack of proper medical attention or treatment which he should have received and which developed into blood poisoning, thereby resulting in his death. I believe that Simmons was a member of the New Zealand Air Force, and had been shot down by the Japanese on or about 20 April 1944. in the vicinity of Bougainville, Solomon Islands."

NZ5050
On 17 April the squadron supplied twelve SBDs to take part in a strike of 86 aircraft against the Japanese airfield at Lakunai, near Rabaul. NZ5050 was last seen over the target and is presumed to have been hit by AAA and crashed into a ravine with the loss of PLTOFF Geoffrey Cray and FSGT Frank Bell. All SBD-5s operated by 25 Squadron were painted in the USN "three-colour scheme" of sea-blue upper surfaces, intermediate blue sides and white undersurfaces.

NZ5051
On 10 May a force of 34 aircraft including twelve 25 Squadron SBDs attacked Lakunai and nearby gun positions. NZ5051, crewed by FLTLT Jack Edwards and W/O Lou Hoppe, released its bombs but was hit by AAA as it pulled up over the runway. The SBD crashed into Greet (Matupi) Harbour with the loss of both crew.

End of tour
25 Squadron's tour ended on 20 May. At 0700 the seventeen SBDs took off from Piva and landed at Renard Field in the Russell Islands where the aircraft were returned to American ownership, reportedly in "as new" condition. The squadron personnel were flown to RNZAF Base Whenuapai the following day.

25 Squadron was disbanded and reformed, with a new commanding officer, as a fighter-bomber squadron equipped with F4U Corsairs (F4U-1s and F4U-1Ds). Several pilots transferred to the new squadron, including Graham Howie who was killed on take-off when his engine failed and he crashed into the jungle on 13 June 1945.

Fate of aircraft
SBD-4s operated at Espiritu Santo returned to USMC in February 1944.
SBD-5s operated from Piva were handed back to USMC in May 1944. One of these is now flown by "Planes of Fame" museum; the only surviving RNZAF *SBD apart from the wrecks of NZ5037, and NZ5021, whose whereabouts is unknown.
SBD-3 and SBD-4s operated in New Zealand were initially stored at Hobsonville, then sold in the late 1940s as scrap.

References

25
Military units and formations established in 1943
Squadrons of the RNZAF in World War II
Military units and formations disestablished in 1945